Yevhen Stanislavovych Troyanovskyi (born 2 July 1993) is a Ukrainian professional footballer who plays as a midfielder for Polish III liga club Wisła Sandomierz.

Career
Troyanovskyi is product of youth team systems of FC Dynamo Kyiv and FC Metalurh Donetsk. He made his debut for FC Metalurh entering as a second-half substitute against FC Vorskla Poltava on 27 October 2012 in Ukrainian Premier League.

References

External links
 
 

1993 births
Living people
People from Sloviansk
Ukrainian footballers
Association football midfielders
Ukraine youth international footballers
Ukraine under-21 international footballers
FC Metalurh Donetsk players
FC Stal Alchevsk players
FC Dynamo-2 Kyiv players
FC Chikhura Sachkhere players
FC Poltava players
FC Olimpik Donetsk players
FC Kramatorsk players
FC Metalurh Zaporizhzhia players
FC Polissya Zhytomyr players
Ukrainian Premier League players
Ukrainian First League players
Ukrainian Second League players
III liga players
Ukrainian expatriate footballers
Expatriate footballers in Georgia (country)
Ukrainian expatriate sportspeople in Georgia (country)
Expatriate footballers in Poland
Ukrainian expatriate sportspeople in Poland
Sportspeople from Donetsk Oblast